Paul Turner (born 11 March 1968) is English musician who has been the bassist of the jazz-funk band Jamiroquai since 2005. He has also performed with Annie Lennox since 2002.

Biography

Paul Turner was born in March 1968 in London. As a child, Turner listened to soul singers such as Ruby Turner and Edwin Starr. In his career as a bassist, Turner has recorded and/or performed live with artists including Tina Turner, Bryan Ferry, Tom Jones and George Michael, Take That, Gary Barlow and 911.

Beginning in 2002, Turner has recorded and performed with Annie Lennox. He joined the jazz-funk band Jamiroquai in 2005 and has recorded and performed live with the band ever since. 

Between Jamiroquai commitments, Paul is active in many genres of music and in a variety of surroundings. He has his own funk/soul band called Shuffler, and he is involved in the eclectic progressive rock trio The Dark Sinatras, who released their first album in May 2012. He was also in the house band for live performances of the 2013 season of the UK TV show The Voice.

Musical style and equipment

Paul has also performed club dates, theatre tours and recording sessions for R&B singers such as Omar, Lamont Dozier and Mica Paris, and jazz-funk names like Down to the Bone and Jeff Lorber.

Turner mainly uses two basses for live performances with Jamiroquai, including a five-string Alleva Coppolo and a four-string 1966 Fender Jazz. (Both are Olympic White with tortoiseshell pickguards.) For amplification, Turner uses Aguilar heads and cabinets. For larger stages, Turner favors a DB751 head with a pair of GS 4x10s; and, for club gigs, he uses the Tone Hammer 500 with two or more SL112s.  His work largely falls within or takes inspiration from contemporary R&B and funk/pop.

References

1968 births
Living people
English rock bass guitarists
Male bass guitarists
People from Sunderland
Musicians from Tyne and Wear
Musicians from London 
English songwriters
British jazz bass guitarists
Jamiroquai members
British male jazz musicians